Black Phoenix Alchemy Lab, also known as BPAL, is an online retailer of perfumes. BPAL is owned by Elizabeth Moriarty Barrial and Brian Constantine, and is based in Philadelphia.

Ethics
Black Phoenix Alchemy Lab does not test their products on animals. Their perfume oils are blended by hand, using sustainably sourced essential oils and absolutes, with synthetics to replace substances such as civet and ambergris. With the exception of blends containing honey and beeswax and  Butter Extract, the oils are vegan-friendly.

Influences and inspirations
The blends are inspired by works of art, mythology, folk superstitions, voodoo, classical literature, historical figures, pirates, and carnivals. Themes include aromatherapy, locations both real and fictional, devilish garden plantings, role playing games, fairy tales, vampire lore, gothic and pagan themes, Lovecraftian mythos, Japanese "Shunga" artwork and deities and concepts from a variety of pantheons.

Black Phoenix Alchemy Lab has also worked with and licensed the rights to create products based on popular and cult favorites such as Guillermo del Toro's film, Crimson Peak., Pretty Deadly, Only Lovers Left Alive, Sherlock Holmes, Fraggle Rock, Labyrinth, Paranorman, The Last Unicorn, Hellboy, Witchblade, David Mack's Kabuki, and numerous other lines inspired by classic literature and comics.

In April 2017, BPAL revisited its collaboration with Neil Gaiman (see Social Causes below) in celebration of the premiere of the American Gods (TV series) on Starz Channel, ten years after they first released fragrances based on his novel of the same name. The newly launched products include perfume oils, atmosphere sprays, and nail polishes. Proceeds once again will go to the CBLDF.

Black Phoenix Alchemy Lab maintains a gothic aesthetic of its website, framing product descriptions with snippets of poetry and category art (monochrome drawings or etchings) by Aubrey Beardsley, Beresford Egan, Félicien Rops, Harry Clarke, Albrecht Dürer, John Tenniel, Andreas Vesalius, Jennifer Williamson, Julie Dillon, Sarah Coleman,  Alicia Dabney], Madame Talbot, and others.

Social causes and compassionate consumerism

Black Phoenix Alchemy Lab also participates in the 4 Green Power For A Green L.A. program.

In 2007, Black Phoenix announced a series of perfumes based on the works of Neil Gaiman inspired by, among others, the novels American Gods, Stardust, The Graveyard Book, Coraline and Anansi Boys. All profits from the Neil Gaiman-inspired scents go to the Comic Book Legal Defense Fund.

Black Phoenix also released a collection of perfumes based on Good Omens (co-authored by Neil Gaiman and Terry Pratchett) and sales went to benefit the CBLDF and the Orangutan Foundation UK. By the end of the first week of July 2007, Neil Gaiman announced on his blog that they had raised $1,500 for the Orangutan Foundation UK and the year-to-date fundraising for the CBLDF had raised over $15,000. By 2010, the CBLDF reported that BPAL's Neil Gaiman line of fragrances had raised over $50,000 for the organization.

In 2012, Black Phoenix Alchemy Lab became a corporate member of the CBLDF and they continue to sponsor the CBLDF's Welcome Party each year at the San Diego Comic Con.

In July 2015, a line called The Collected Poetic Works of Antonin Scalia debuted, based on the Supreme Court Justice's "colorfully vitriolic superlatives." A portion from the sale of every bottle is donated to the Southern Poverty Law Center, the Trevor Project and the National Center for Transgender Equality.

In November 2015, BPAL released a scent called Palmyra. All proceeds after the cost of manufacture went to benefit the UNHCR’s efforts to aid refugees and meet humanitarian needs.

In October 2016, BPAL released a scent based on Donald Trump's unprecedented remark directed at Hillary Clinton during the third Presidential debate, Nasty Woman. Proceeds from this fragrance were split between Planned Parenthood and Emily's list.

Collaborations
In 2013, BPAL created a perfume called The Gatekeeper which was inspired by The Maze of Games, an interactive puzzle novel written by Mike Selinker and illustrated by Pete Venters. The scent was offered as a Kickstarter perk and then became part of the catalog.

Erin Morgenstern, author of The Night Circus, named "the olfactory geniuses of Black Phoenix Alchemy Lab" in the book's acknowledgments.

In April 2007, Weird Tales published a piece of original fiction entitled "Six Scents" by Lisa Mantchev, which drew its inspiration from six BPAL fragrances.

In 2005, the Lab was named as The Village Voice's Best of New York: Best Scent Indulgence for Your Inner Goth.

Notes

External links
 Black Phoenix Alchemy Lab
 List of celebrity-branded fragrances

Perfume houses
Online retailers of the United States